An autonomous municipality or city, previously provincial city, is a de jure second-level administrative division unit in the Republic of China (Taiwan).

The provincial cities were formerly under the jurisdiction of provinces, but the provinces were streamlined and effectively downsized to non-self-governing bodies in 1998, in 2018 all provincial governmental organs were formally abolished. Provincial cities along counties, are presently regarded as de facto principal subdivisions directed by the central government of the ROC.

History 

The first administrative divisions entitled "city" were established in the 1920s when Taiwan was under Japanese rule. At this time cities were under the jurisdiction of prefectures. After the World War II, nine (9) out of eleven (11) prefectural cities established by the Japanese government were reform into provincial cities. Their roman spellings are also changed to reflect the official language shift from Japanese to Mandarin Chinese, but characters remain the same.

The reform was based on the Laws on the City Formation of the Republic of China. This law was passed in the early 20th century. The criteria for being a provincial city included being the provincial capital as well as having a population of over 200,000, or over 100,000 if the city had particular significance in politics, economics, and culture. The division reform in 1945 had some compromises between the Japanese and the Chinese systems, some of the cities with population under the criteria were still be established as provincial cities.

After the government of the Republic of China relocated to Taipei, Taiwan in 1949, the population criterion for provincial cities was raised to 500,000 in the Guidelines on the Implementation of Local Autonomy in the Counties and Cities of Taiwan Province, which was passed in 1981. It was later raised again to 600,000. Since the streamline of provinces in 1998, provincial cities are all directly under the central government, and are simply referred to as cities.

The People's Republic of China (PRC), which claims Taiwan as its 23rd province, has all of its provincial cities classified as county-level city.

Current cities 

Currently, the Local Government Act of the Ministry of the Interior applies for the creation of a city, in which a city needs to have a population between 500,000 and 1,250,000 and occupies major political, economical and cultural roles. Note that all three existing cities are not qualified for the population test, they were built for historical reasons.

There are currently three cities, all in Taiwan Province:

Their self-governed bodies (executive and legislature) regulated by the Local Government Act are:

See also
 Cities of Japan
 Political divisions of Taiwan (1895–1945)
 Prefecture-level city of China

Notes

Words in native languages

References